The 1878 Peterborough by-election was fought on 29 October 1878.  The byelection was fought due to the death of the incumbent Liberal MP, George Hammond Whalley.

The result
It was won by the Liberal candidate John Wentworth-FitzWilliam.

References

1878 in England
Politics of Peterborough
1878 elections in the United Kingdom
By-elections to the Parliament of the United Kingdom in Cambridgeshire constituencies
19th century in Cambridgeshire